William Marrion Branham (April 6, 1909 – December 24, 1965) was an American Christian minister and faith healer who initiated the post-World War II healing revival, and claimed to be a prophet with the anointing of Elijah, who had come to prelude Christ's second coming; some of his followers have been labeled a "doomsday cult". He is credited as "a principal architect of restorationist thought" for charismatics by some Christian historians, and has been called the "leading individual in the Second Wave of Pentecostalism." He made a lasting influence on televangelism and the modern charismatic movement,  and his "stage presence remains a legend unparalleled in the history of the Charismatic movement". At the time they were held, his inter-denominational meetings were the largest religious meetings ever held in some American cities. Branham was the first American deliverance minister to successfully campaign in Europe; his ministry reached global audiences with major campaigns held in North America, Europe, Africa, and India.

Branham claimed that he had received an angelic visitation on May 7, 1946, commissioning his worldwide ministry and launching his campaigning career in mid-1946. His fame rapidly spread as crowds were drawn to his stories of angelic visitations and reports of miracles happening at his meetings. His ministry spawned many emulators and set the broader healing revival that later became the modern charismatic movement in motion. At the peak of his popularity in the 1950s, Branham was widely adored and "the neo-Pentecostal world believed Branham to be a prophet to their generation". From 1955, Branham's campaigning and popularity began to decline as the Pentecostal churches began to withdraw their support from the healing campaigns for primarily financial reasons. By 1960, Branham transitioned into a teaching ministry.

Unlike his contemporaries, who followed doctrinal teachings which are known as the Full Gospel tradition, Branham developed an alternative theology which was primarily a mixture of Calvinist and Arminian doctrines, and had a heavy focus on dispensationalism and Branham's own unique eschatological views. While widely accepting the restoration doctrine he espoused during the healing revival, his divergent post-revival teachings were deemed increasingly controversial by his charismatic and Pentecostal contemporaries, who subsequently disavowed many of the doctrines as "revelatory madness". His teachings on serpent seed and his belief that membership in a Christian denomination was connected to the mark of the beast alienated many of his former supporters. His closest followers, however, accepted his sermons as oral scripture and refer to his teachings as The Message. Despite Branham's objections, some followers of his teachings placed him at the center of a cult of personality during his final years. Branham claimed that he had converted over one million people during his career. His teachings continue to be promoted by the William Branham Evangelistic Association, which reported that about 2 million people received its material in 2018. Branham died following a car accident in 1965.

Throughout his healing revivals, Branham was accused of committing fraud by investigative news reporters, fellow ministers, host churches, and governmental agencies. Numerous people pronounced healed died shortly thereafter, investigators discovered evidence suggesting miracles may have been staged, and Branham was found to have significantly embellished and falsified numerous stories he presented to his audiences as fact. Branham faced legal problems as a result of his practices. The governments of South Africa and Norway intervened in order to stop his healing campaigns in their countries. In the United States, Branham was charged with tax evasion for failing to account for the donations received through his ministry; admitting his liability, he settled the case out of court. The news media has linked Branham to multiple notorious figures. Branham was baptized and ordained a minister by Roy Davis, the National Imperial Wizard (leader) of the Ku Klux Klan; the two men maintained a lifelong relationship. Branham helped launch and popularize the ministry of Jim Jones. Paul Schäfer, Robert Martin Gumbura, Leo Mercer, and other followers of William Branham's teachings have regularly been in the news due to the serious crimes which they committed. Followers of Branham's teachings in Colonia Dignidad were portrayed in the 2015 film Colonia.

Early life

Childhood

William M. Branham was born near Burkesville, Kentucky, on April 6, 1909, the son of Charles and Ella Harvey Branham, the oldest of ten children. He claimed that at his birth, a "Light come  whirling through the window, about the size of a pillow, and circled around where I was, and went down on the bed".  Branham told his publicist Gordon Lindsay that he had mystical experiences from an early age; and that at age three he heard a "voice" speaking to him from a tree telling him "he would live near a city called New Albany".  According to Branham, that year his family moved to Jeffersonville, Indiana. Branham also said that when he was seven years old, God told him to avoid smoking and drinking alcoholic beverages. Branham stated he never violated the command.

Branham told his audiences that he grew up in "deep poverty", often not having adequate clothing, and that his family was involved in criminal activities. Branham's neighbors reported him as "someone who always seemed a little different", but said he was a dependable youth. Branham explained that his tendency towards "mystical experiences and moral purity" caused misunderstandings among his friends, family, and other young people; he was a "black sheep" from an early age. Branham called his childhood "a terrible life."

Branham's father owned a farm near Utica, Indiana and took a job working for O.H. Wathen, owner of R.E. Wathen Distilleries in nearby Louisville, Kentucky. Wathen was a supplier for Al Capone's bootlegging operations. Branham told his audiences that he was required to help his father with the illegal production and sale of liquor during prohibition. In March 1924, Branham's father was arrested for his criminal activities; he was convicted and sentenced to a prison. The Indiana Ku Klux Klan claimed responsibility for attacking and shutting down the Jeffersonville liquor producing ring.

Branham was involved in a firearms incident and was shot in both legs in March 1924, at age 14; he later told his audiences he was involved in a hunting accident. Two of his brothers also suffered life-threatening injuries at the same time. Branham was rushed to the hospital for treatment. His family was unable to pay for his medical bills, but members of the Indiana Ku Klux Klan stepped in to cover the expenses. The help of the Klan during his impoverished childhood had a profound impact on Branham throughout his life. As late as 1963, Branham continued to speak highly of the them saying, "the Ku Klux Klan, paid the hospital bill for me, Masons. I can never forget them. See? No matter what they do, or what, I still... there is something, and that stays with me..." Branham would go on to maintain lifelong connections to the KKK.

Conversion and early influences

Branham told his audiences that he left home at age 19 in search of a better life, traveling to Phoenix, Arizona, where he worked on a ranch for two years and began a successful career in boxing. While Branham was away, his brother Edward aged 18, shot and killed a Jeffersonville man and was charged with murder. Edward died of a sudden illness only a short time later. Branham returned to Jeffersonville in June 1929 to attend the funeral. Branham had no experience with religion as a child; he said that the first time he heard a prayer was at his brother's funeral.

Soon afterward, while he was working for the Public Service Company of Indiana, Branham was overcome by gas and had to be hospitalized. Branham said that he heard a voice speaking to him while he was recovering from the accident, which led him to begin seeking God. Shortly thereafter, he began attending the First Pentecostal Baptist Church of Jeffersonville, where he converted to Christianity. The church was pastored by Roy Davis, a founding member of the second Ku Klux Klan and a leading recruiter for the organization. Davis later became the National Imperial Wizard (leader) of the KKK. Davis baptized Branham and six months later, he ordained Branham as an Independent Baptist minister and an elder in his church. Supported by the KKK's Imperial Kludd (chaplain) Caleb Ridley, Branham traveled with Davis and they participated together in revivals in other states.

At the time of Branham's conversion, the First Pentecostal Baptist Church of Jeffersonville was a nominally Baptist church which adhered to some Pentecostal doctrines, including divine healing and speaking in tongues; Branham reported that his baptism at the church was done using the Jesus name formula of Oneness Pentecostalism. Branham claimed to have been opposed to Pentecostalism during the early years of his ministry. However, according to multiple Branham biographers, like Baptist historian Doug Weaver and Pentecostal historian Bernie Wade, Branham was exposed to Pentecostal teachings from his conversion.

Branham claimed to his audiences he was first exposed to a Pentecostal church in 1936, which invited him to join, but he refused. Weaver speculated that Branham may have chosen to hide his early connections to Pentecostalism to make his conversion story more compelling to his Pentecostal audiences during the years of the healing revival. Weaver identified several parts of Branham's reported life story that conflicted with historical documentation and suggested Branham began significantly embellished his early life story to his audiences beginning in the 1940s.

During June 1933, Branham held tent revival meetings that were sponsored by Davis and the First Pentecostal Baptist Church. On June 2 that year, the Jeffersonville Evening News said the Branham campaign reported 14 converts. His followers believed his ministry was accompanied by miraculous signs from its beginning, and that when he was baptizing converts on June 11, 1933, in the Ohio River near Jeffersonville, a bright light descended over him and that he heard a voice say, "As John the Baptist was sent to forerun the first coming of Jesus Christ, so your message will forerun His second coming".

Belief in the baptismal story is a critical element of faith among Branham's followers. In his early references to the event during the healing revival, Branham interpreted it to refer to the restoration of the gifts of the spirit to the church. In later years, Branham significantly altered how he told the baptismal story, and came to connect the event to his teaching ministry. He claimed reports of the baptismal story were carried in newspapers across the United States and Canada. Because of the way Branham's telling of the baptismal story changed over the years, and because no newspaper actually covered the event, Weaver said Branham may have embellished the story after he began achieving success in the healing revival during the 1940s.

Besides Roy Davis and the First Pentecostal Baptist Church, Branham reported interaction with other groups during the 1930s who were an influence on his ministry. During the early 1930s, he became acquainted with William Sowders' School of the Prophets, a Pentecostal group in Kentucky and Indiana. Through Sowders' group, he was introduced to the British Israelite House of David and in the autumn of 1934, Branham traveled to Michigan to meet with members of the group.

Early ministry

Branham took over leadership of Roy Davis's Jeffersonville church in 1934, after Davis was arrested again and extradited to stand trial. Sometime during March or April 1934, the First Pentecostal Baptist Church was destroyed by a fire and Branham's supporters at the church helped him organize a new church in Jeffersonville. At first Branham preached out of a tent at 8th and Pratt street, and he also reported temporarily preaching in an orphanage building.

By 1936, the congregation had constructed a new church on the same block as Branham's tent, at the corner of 8th and Penn street. The church was built on the same location reported by the local newspaper as the site of his June 1933 tent campaign. Newspaper articles reported the original name of Branham's new church to be the Pentecostal Tabernacle. The church was officially registered with the City of Jeffersonville as the Billie Branham Pentecostal Tabernacle in November 1936. Newspaper articles continued to refer to his church as the Pentecostal Tabernacle until 1943. Branham served as pastor until 1946, and the church name eventually shortened to the Branham Tabernacle. The church flourished at first, but its growth began to slow. Because of the Great Depression, it was often short of funds, so Branham served without compensation.

Branham continued traveling and preaching among Pentecostal churches while serving as pastor of his new church. Branham obtained a truck and had it painted with advertisements for his healing ministry which he toured in. In September 1934, he traveled to Mishawaka, Indiana where he was invited to speak at the Pentecostal Assemblies of Jesus Christ (PAJC) General Assembly meetings organized by Bishop G. B. Rowe. Branham was "not impressed with the multi-cultural aspects of the PAJC as it was contrary to the dogmas advanced by his friends in the Ku Klux Klan."

Branham and his future wife Amelia Hope Brumbach (b. July 16, 1913) attended the First Pentecostal Baptist Church together beginning in 1929 where Brumbach served as young people's leader. The couple began dating in 1933. Branham married Brumbach in June 1934. Their first child, William "Billy" Paul Branham was born soon after their marriage; the date given for his birth varies by source. In some of Branham's biographies, his first son's birth date is reported as September 13, 1935, but in government records his birth date is reported as September 13, 1934. Branham's wife became ill during the second year of their marriage. According to her death certificate, she was diagnosed with pulmonary tuberculosis in January 1936, beginning a period of declining health. Despite her diagnosis, the couple had a second child, Sharon Rose, who was born on October 27, 1936. In September 1936, the local news reported that Branham held a multi-week healing revival at the Pentecostal Tabernacle in which he reported eight healings.

The following year, disaster struck when Jeffersonville was ravaged by the Ohio River flood of 1937. Branham's congregation was badly impacted by the disaster and his family was displaced from their home. By February 1937, the floodwaters had receded, his church survived intact and Branham resumed holding services at the Pentecostal Tabernacle. Following the January flood, Hope's health continued to decline, and she succumbed to her illness and died on July 22, 1937. Sharon Rose, who had been born with her mother's illness, died four days later (July 26, 1937). Their obituaries reported Branham as pastor of the Pentecostal Tabernacle, the same church where their funerals were held.

Branham frequently related the story of the death of his wife and daughter during his ministry and evoked strong emotional responses from his audiences. Branham told his audiences that his wife and daughter had become suddenly ill and died during the January flood as God's punishment because of his failure to embrace Pentecostalism. Branham said he made several suicide attempts following their deaths. Peter Duyzer noted that Branham's story of the events surrounding the death of his wife and daughter conflicted with historical evidence; they did not die during the flood, he and his wife were both already Pentecostals before they married, and he was pastor of a Pentecostal church at the time of their deaths.

By the summer of 1940, Branham had resumed traveling and held revival meetings in other nearby communities. Branham married his second wife Meda Marie Broy in 1941, and together they had three children; Rebekah (b. 1946), Sarah (b. 1950), and Joseph (b. 1955).

Healing revival

Background
Branham is known for his role in the healing revivals that occurred in the United States in the 1940s and 1950s, and most participants in the movement regarded him as its initiator. Christian writer John Crowder described the period of revivals as "the most extensive public display of miraculous power in modern history". Some, like Christian author and countercult activist Hank Hanegraaff, rejected the entire healing revival as a hoax and condemned the movement as cult in his 1997 book Counterfeit Revival.

Divine healing is a tradition and belief that was historically held by a majority of Christians but it became increasingly associated with Evangelical Protestantism. The fascination of most of American Christianity with divine healing played a significant role in the popularity and inter-denominational nature of the revival movement.

Branham held massive inter-denominational meetings, from which came reports of hundreds of miracles. Historian David Harrell described Branham and Oral Roberts as the two giants of the movement and called Branham its "unlikely leader."

Early campaigns

Branham had been traveling and holding revival meetings since at least 1940 before attracting national attention.  Branham's popularity began to grow following the 1942 meetings in Milltown, Indiana where it was reported that a young girl had been healed of tuberculosis. The news of the reported healing was slow to spread, but was eventually reported to a family in Missouri who in 1945 invited Branham to pray for their child who was suffering from a similar illness; Branham reported that the child recovered after his prayers.

News of two events eventually reached W. E. Kidston. Kidston was intrigued by the reported miracles and invited Branham to participate in revival meetings that he was organizing. W. E. Kidston, was editor of The Apostolic Herald and had many contacts in the Pentecostal movement. Kidston served as Branham's first campaign manager and was instrumental in helping organize Branham's early revival meetings.

Branham held his first large meetings as a faith healer in 1946. His healing services are well documented, and he is regarded as the pacesetter for those who followed him. At the time they were held, Branham's revival meetings were the largest religious meetings some American cities he visited had ever seen; reports of 1,000 to 1,500 converts per meeting were common.

Historians name his June 1946 St. Louis meetings as the inauguration of the healing revival period. Branham said he had received an angelic visitation on May 7, 1946, commissioning his worldwide ministry. In his later years, he also connected the angelic visitation with the establishment of the nation of Israel, at one point mistakenly stating the vision occurred on the same day.

His first reported revival meetings of the period were held over 12 days during June 1946 in St. Louis. Time magazine reported on his St. Louis campaign meetings, and according to the article, Branham drew a crowd of over 4,000 sick people who desired healing and recorded him diligently praying for each. Branham's fame began to grow as a result of the publicity and reports covering his meetings.

Herald of Faith magazine which was edited by prominent Pentecostal minister Joseph Mattsson-Boze and published by Philadelphia Pentecostal Church in Chicago also began following and exclusively publishing stories from the Branham campaigns, giving Branham wide exposure to the Pentecostal movement. Following the St. Louis meetings, Branham launched a tour of small Oneness Pentecostal churches across the Midwest and southern United States, from which stemmed reports of healing and one report of a resurrection. By August his fame had spread widely. He held meetings that month in Jonesboro, Arkansas, and drew a crowd of 25,000 with attendees from 28 different states. The size of the crowds presented a problem for Branham's team as they found it difficult to find venues that could seat large numbers of attendees.

Branham's revivals were interracial from their inception and were noted for their "racial openness" during the period of widespread racial unrest. An African American minister participating in the St. Louis meetings claimed to be healed during the revival, helping to bring Branham a sizable African American following from the early days of the revival. Branham held interracial meetings even in the southern states. To satisfy segregation laws when ministering in the south, Branham's team would use a rope to divide the crowd by race.

Author and researcher Patsy Sims noted that venues used to host campaign meetings also hosted KKK rallies just days prior to the revival meetings, which sometimes led to racial tensions. Sims, who attended both the KKK rallies and the healing revivals, was surprised to see some of the same groups of people at both events. According to Steven Hassan, KKK recruitment was covertly conducted through Branham's ministry.

After holding a very successful revival meeting in Shreveport during mid-1947, Branham began assembling an evangelical team that stayed with him for most of the revival period. The first addition to the team was Jack Moore and Young Brown, who periodically assisted him in managing his meetings. Following the Shreveport meetings, Branham held a series of meetings in San Antonio, Phoenix, and at various locations in California. Moore invited his friend Gordon Lindsay to join the campaign team, which he did beginning at a meeting in Sacramento, California, in late 1947.

Lindsay was a successful publicist and manager for Branham, and played a key role in helping him gain national and international recognition. In 1948, Branham and Lindsay founded Voice of Healing magazine, which was originally aimed at reporting Branham's healing campaigns. The story of Samuel the Prophet, who heard a voice speak to him in the night, inspired Branham's name for the publication. Lindsay was impressed with Branham's focus on humility and unity, and was instrumental in helping him gain acceptance among Trinitarian and Oneness Pentecostal groups by expanding his revival meetings beyond the United Pentecostal Church to include all of the major Pentecostal groups.

The first meetings organized by Lindsay were held in northwestern North America during late 1947. At the first of these meetings, held in Vancouver, British Columbia, Canadian minister Ern Baxter joined Branham's team. Lindsay reported 70,000 attendees to the 14 days of meetings and long prayer lines as Branham prayed for the sick. William Hawtin, a Canadian Pentecostal minister, attended one of Branham's Vancouver meetings in November 1947 and was impressed by Branham's healings. Branham was an important influence on the Latter Rain revival movement, which Hawtin helped initiate.

In January 1948, meetings were held in Florida; F. F. Bosworth met Branham at the meetings and also joined his team. Bosworth was among the pre-eminent ministers of the Pentecostal movement and a founding ministers of the Assemblies of God; Bosworth lent great weight to Branham's campaign team. He remained a strong Branham supporter until his death in 1958. Bosworth endorsed Branham as "the most sensitive person to the presence and working of the Holy Spirit" he had ever met.

During early 1947, a major campaign was held in Kansas City, where Branham and Lindsay first met Oral Roberts. Roberts and Branham had contact at different points during the revival. Roberts said Branham was "set apart, just like Moses".

Branham spent many hours ministering and praying for the sick during his campaigns, and like many other leading evangelists of the time he suffered exhaustion. After one year of campaigning, his exhaustion began leading to health issues. Branham reported to his audiences that he suffered a nervous breakdown and required treatment by the Mayo Clinic. Branham's illness coincided with a series of allegations of fraud in his healing revivals. Attendees reported seeing him "staggering from intense fatigue" during his last meetings.

Just as Branham began to attract international attention in May 1948, he announced that due to illness he would have to halt his campaign. His illness shocked the growing movement, and his abrupt departure from the field caused a rift between him and Lindsay over the Voice of Healing magazine. Branham insisted that Lindsay take over complete management of the publication. With the main subject of the magazine no longer actively campaigning, Lindsay was forced to seek other ministers to promote. He decided to publicize Oral Roberts during Branham's absence, and Roberts quickly rose to prominence, in large part due to Lindsay's coverage.

Branham partially recovered from his illness and resumed holding meetings in October 1948; in that month he held a series of meetings around the United States without Lindsay's support. Branham's return to the movement led to his resumed leadership of it. In November 1948, he met with Lindsay and Moore and told them he had received another angelic visitation, instructing him to hold a series of meetings across the United States and then to begin holding meetings internationally. As a result of the meeting, Lindsay rejoined Branham's campaigning team.

Style

Most revivalists of the era were flamboyant but Branham was usually calm and spoke quietly, only occasionally raising his voice. His preaching style was described as "halting and simple", and crowds were drawn to his stories of angelic visitation and "constant communication with God". Branham tailored his language usage to best connect to his audiences. When speaking to poor and working-class audiences, he tended to use poor grammar and folksy language; when speaking to more educated audiences and ministerial associations, he generally spoke using perfect grammar and avoided slang usage.

He refused to discuss controversial doctrinal issues during the healing campaigns, and issued a policy statement that he would only minister on the "great evangelical truths". He insisted his calling was to bring unity among the different churches he was ministering to and to urge the churches to return to the roots of early Christianity.

In the first part of his meetings, one of Branham's companion evangelists would preach a sermon. Ern Baxter or F. F. Bosworth usually filled this role, but other ministers like Paul Cain also participated in Branham's campaigns in later years. Baxter generally focused on bible teaching; Bosworth counseled supplicants on the need for faith and the doctrine of divine healing.  Following their build-up, Branham would take the podium and deliver a short sermon, in which he usually related stories about his personal life experiences.

Branham would often request God to "confirm his message with two-or-three faith inspired miracles". Supplicants seeking healing submitted prayer cards to Branham's campaign team stating their name, address, and condition; Branham's team would select a number of submissions to be prayed for personally by Branham and organized a prayer line. After completing his sermon, he would proceed with the prayer line where he would pray for the sick. Branham would often tell supplicants what they suffered from, their name, and their address.

He would pray for each of them, pronouncing some or all healed. Branham generally prayed for a few people each night and believed witnessing the results on the stage would inspire faith in the audience and permit them to experience similar results without having to be personally prayed for. Branham would also call out a few members still in the audience, who had not been accepted into the prayer line, stating their illness and pronouncing them healed.

Branham told his audiences that he was able to determine their illness, details of their lives, and pronounce them healed as a result of an angel who was guiding him. Describing Branham's method, Bosworth said "he does not begin to pray for the healing of the afflicted in body in the healing line each night until God anoints him for the operation of the gift, and until he is conscious of the presence of the Angel with him on the platform. Without this consciousness he seems to be perfectly helpless."

Branham explained to his audiences that the angel that commissioned his ministry had given him two signs by which they could prove his commission. He described the first sign as vibrations he felt in his hand when he touched a sick person's hand, which communicated to him the nature of the illness, but did not guarantee healing.  Branham's use of what his fellow evangelists called a word of knowledge gift separated him from his contemporaries in the early days of the revival.

This second sign did not appear in his campaigns until after his recovery in 1948, and was used to "amaze tens of thousands" at his meetings. As the revival progressed, his contemporaries began to mirror the practice.  According to Bosworth, this gift of knowledge allowed Branham "to see and enable him to tell the many events of [people's] lives from their childhood down to the present".

This caused many in the healing revival to view Branham as a "seer like the old testament prophets". Branham amazed even fellow evangelists, which served to further push him into a legendary status in the movement. Branham's audiences were often awestruck by the events during his meetings. At the peak of his popularity in the 1950s, Branham was widely adored and "the neo-Pentecostal world believed Branham to be a prophet to their generation".

Growing fame and international campaigns

In January 1950, Branham's campaign team held their Houston campaign, one of the most significant series of meetings of the revival. The location of their first meeting was too small to accommodate the approximately 8,000 attendees, and they had to relocate to the Sam Houston Coliseum. On the night of January 24, 1950, Branham was photographed during a debate between Bosworth and local Baptist minister W. E. Best regarding the theology of divine healing.

Bosworth argued in favor, while Best argued against. The photograph showed a light above Branham's head, which he and his associates believed to be supernatural.  The photograph became well-known in the revival movement and is regarded by Branham's followers as an iconic relic. Branham believed the light was a divine vindication of his ministry; others believed it was a glare from the venue's overhead lighting.

In January 1951, former US Congressman William Upshaw was sent by Roy Davis to a Branham campaign meeting in California. Upshaw had limited mobility for 59 years as the result of an accident, and said he was miraculously healed in the meeting. The publicity of the event took Branham's fame to a new level. Upshaw sent a letter describing his healing claim to each member of Congress. The Los Angeles Times reported on the healing in an article titled "Ex-Rep. Upshaw Discards Crutches After 59 Years". Upshaw explained to reporters that he had already been able to walk without the aid of his crutches prior to attending Branham's meeting, but following Branham's prayer his strength increased so that he could walk much longer distances unaided. Upshaw died in November 1952, at the age of 86.

According to Pentecostal historian Rev. Walter Hollenweger, "Branham filled the largest stadiums and meeting halls in the world" during his five major international campaigns. Branham held his first series of campaigns in Europe during April 1950 with meetings in Finland, Sweden, and Norway. Attendance at the meetings generally exceeded 7,000 despite resistance to his meetings by the state churches. Branham was the first American deliverance minister to successfully tour in Europe.

A 1952 campaign in South Africa had the largest attendance in Branham's career, with an estimated 200,000 attendees. According to Lindsay, the altar call at his Durban meeting received 30,000 converts. During international campaigns in 1954, Branham visited Portugal, Italy, and India. Branham's final major overseas tour in 1955 included visits to Switzerland and Germany.

Branham's meetings were regularly attended by journalists, who wrote articles about the miracles reported by Branham and his team throughout the years of his revivals, and claimed patients were cured of various ailments after attending prayer meetings with Branham. Durban Sunday Tribune and The Natal Mercury reported wheelchair-bound people rising and walking. Winnipeg Free Press reported a girl was cured of deafness. El Paso Herald-Post reported hundreds of attendees at one meeting seeking divine healing. Despite such occasional glowing reports, most of the press coverage Branham received was negative.

Allegations of fraud
To his American audiences, Branham claimed several high profile events occurred during his international tours. Branham claimed to visit and pray for King George VI while en route to Finland in 1950. He claimed the king was healed through his prayers. Researchers found no evidence that Branham ever met King George; King George was chronically ill and died about a year after Branham claimed to heal him.

Branham also claimed to pray for and heal the granddaughter of Florence Nightingale at a London airport. Branham's campaign produced photos of an emaciated woman who they claimed to be Nightingale's granddaughter. However, Florence Nightingale never married and had no children or grandchildren. Investigators of Branham's claim were unable to identify the woman in the photograph.

Branham similarly claimed to pray for King Gustaf V while in Sweden in April 1950. Investigators found no evidence for the meeting; King Gustaf V died in October 1950. Branham claimed to stop in Egypt in 1954 while en route to India to meet with King Farouk; however Farouk had been deposed in 1952 and was not living in Egypt at the time. Branham claimed to visit the grave of Buddha while in India, however Buddha was cremated and has no grave. In total, critics of Branham identified many claims which appeared to be false when investigated. Weaver accused Branham of major embellishments.

Branham faced criticism and opposition from the early days of the healing revival, and he was repeatedly accused of fraud throughout his ministry. According to historian Ronald Kydd, Branham evoked strong opinions from people with whom he came into contact; "most people either loved him or hated him". Kydd stated that it "is impossible to get even an approximate number of people healed in Branham's ministry." No consistent record of follow-ups of the healing claims were made, making analysis of many claims difficult to subsequent researchers. Additionally, Branham's procedures made verification difficult at the time of his revivals. Branham believed in positive confession. He required supplicants to claim to be healed to demonstrate their faith, even if they were still experiencing symptoms. He frequently told supplicants to expect their symptoms to remain for several days after their healing. This led to people professing to be healed at the meetings, while still suffering from the condition. Only follow up after Branham's waiting period had passed could ascertain the result of the healing.

From the early days of the healing revival, Branham received overwhelmingly unfavorable coverage in the news media, which was often quite critical. At his June 1947 revivals in Vandalia, Illinois, the local news reported that Beck Walker, a man who was deaf and mute from birth, was pronounced healed but failed to recover. Branham claimed Walker failed to recover his hearing because he had disobeyed Branham's instruction to stop smoking cigarettes. Branham was lambasted by critics who asked how it was possible the deaf man could have heard his command to stop smoking.

At his 1947 meetings in Winnipeg, Branham claimed to have raised a young man from the dead at a Jeffersonville funeral parlor. Branham's sensational claim was reported in the news in the United States and Canada, leading to a news media investigation to identify the funeral home and the individual raised from the dead. Reporters subsequently found no evidence of a resurrection; no funeral parlor in the city corroborated the story. The same year the news media in Winnipeg publicized Branham's cases of failed healing. In response, the churches which hosted Branham's campaign conducted independent follow-up interviews with people Branham pronounced healed to gather testimonies which they could use to counter the negative press. To their surprise, their investigation failed to confirm any cases of actual healing; every person they interviewed had failed to recover.

At meetings in Vancouver during 1947, newspaper reporters discovered that one young girl had been in Branham's prayer lines in multiple cities posing as a cripple, but rising to walk after Branham pronounced her healed each time. An investigative reporter suspected Branham had staged the miracle. Reporters at the meeting also attempted to follow up on the case of a Calgary woman pronounced healed by Branham who had died shortly after he left the city. Reporters attempted to confront Branham over these issues, but Branham refused to be interviewed.

Branham was also accused of fraud by fellow ministers and churches that hosted his meetings. In 1947, Rev. Alfred Pohl, the Missionary-Secretary of Pentecostal Assemblies of Canada, served as Branham's guide and host at meetings across western Canada. Pohl stated that many people Branham pronounced as healed later died and produced witnesses to validate his allegations. Pohl stated that the numerous deaths "severely tested the faith" of many ministers who had trusted in Branham. Pohl also claimed Branham was frequently given and accepted large financial gifts from individuals who he pronounced as healed, including those who subsequently died.

In 1948, W. J. Taylor, a district superintendent with the Pentecostal Assemblies of Canada, raised concerns again following another wave of Branham meetings and asked for a thorough investigation. Taylor presented evidence that claims of the number of people healed were vastly overestimated, and that multiple people pronounced healed by Branham had subsequently died. While he stated his personal admiration for Branham, the troubling number of deaths led him to suggest "there is a possibility that this whole thing is wrong".

Churches in Canada continued to experience crises following Branham campaign meetings as they attempted to explain the numerous failed healings to their congregations. At meetings in Regina, Branham pronounced the wife of a prominent minister healed of cancer. The minister and his wife were overjoyed, and the minister excitedly shared the details of the healing with his radio audience in Ontario later that week. To his surprise, his wife died only days later of her illness. The confusion created by the situation led ministers to claim Branham had deceived them.

According to Kydd, "the controversy surrounding Branham deepened" with time. Kydd reported that by watching films of the revival meetings, "the viewer would assume almost everyone was healed", but "results were less promising whenever follow-up was made." One such case was Carol Strubler, who at age nine in 1954 was prayed for by Branham at a recorded revival in Washington, D.C., when he preached a sermon entitled "The Deep Calleth Unto The Deep". One newspaper reported, "Rev. William Branham of Jeffersonville, Ind., prayed for her and assured the heartbroken mother her daughter would live. A week later the mother told this newspaper she was confident the evangelist's words were true and had cancelled a scheduled visit to St. Christopher's Hospital in Philadelphia." However, Strubbler died "of acute leukemia, just three weeks after [Branham] told her mother she was healed of the fatal sickness." Another case was four-year-old Donny Morton, who was diagnosed with a rare brain condition. At recorded meetings in California during April 1951, Branham pronounced Morton healed, but the child subsequently died in October. His story was published in Reader's Digest.

Similar allegations came from Branham's European campaigns. Rev. Walter Hollenweger, who served as a translator on Branham's European tours, reported that "very few were actually healed" in the campaigns, and the overwhelming majority pronounced healed by Branham failed to recover. Hollenweger said that while there were a few "well-attested cases of miraculous healing", Branham was "naïve" and "dishonest" and misled his audiences when he reported the number of people healed. Hollenweger was disappointed that Branham refused to acknowledge the numerous failed pronouncements of healings.

In 1955, Leonard Steiner, pastor of a Pentecostal church in Zurich Switzerland that hosted a Branham meeting reported cases of failed healing and the negative consequences for members of his congregation. Allegations in Norway led authorities to limit Branham's ability to hold meetings; the Directorate of Health forbade Branham from laying hands on the sick and sent police to his meetings to enforce the order.

Serious allegations also were made following Branham's meetings in South Africa during 1952 and complaints were lodged with government authorities. Michael Plaff, a doctor, was pronounced healed of cancer by Branham during one meeting. In February 1952, the Branham campaign published an article claiming Plaff had visited the hospital the day after he was prayed for and his cure was confirmed by medical tests. However, Plaff had died of his cancer just days after being pronounced healed.  A minister attending meetings in Durban with his congregation reported that over twenty people suffering from tuberculosis were pronounced healed by Branham, but all failed to recover. In another case, a woman suffering a heart condition was pronounced healed by Branham, but died less than a week later. A 23-year-old leukemia patient was pronounced healed by Branham, but failed to recover and died about thirteen months later.

The Branham campaign published a book entitled "A Prophet Visit South Africa" to publicize the success of the tour. The book related the details of dozens of healings. Investigators in South Africa followed up on the reported healings and found that 46 of the people Branham said had been healed had failed to recover. After reviewing the results of the investigation, one minister concluded "that the cures claimed are so largely exaggerated as to be almost fraudulent in their claim."  When Branham attempted to visit South Africa again in 1965, the South African government placed restrictions on his visa preventing him from holding any healing revivals while he was in the country.

Ern Baxter, who participated in most of Branham's campaigns between November 1947 and 1953 including his tours to India and Europe, reflected on the exaggerated reports of miracles in the healing revival in a 1978 interview. He explained that the allegations eroded the trust of the crowds who attended the healing services.

Some attendees of Branham's meetings believed that some healings were staged and accused him of selectively choosing who could enter the prayer line. Some people left his meetings disappointed after finding Branham's conviction that everyone in the audience could be healed without being in the prayer line proved incorrect. Branham generally attributed the failure of supplicants to receive healing to their lack of faith. According to Pohl, Hollenweger, and Steiner, Branham's practice of blaming the supplicant for lack of faith was severely damaging in multiple churches and left many people who failed to receive healing in despair.

The "word of knowledge" gift used by Branham was also subject to much criticism. Hollenweger investigated Branham's use of the "word of knowledge gift" and found no instances in which Branham was mistaken in his often-detailed pronouncements. Criticism of Branham's use of this gift was primarily around its nature; some asserted that it was a non-Christian practice and accused him of witchcraft and telepathy. Branham was openly confronted with such criticisms and rejected the assertions.

Others alleged that Branham's discernments were not genuine. Many people Branham prayed for were required to first write their name, address, and what they were seeking prayer for on prayer cards. The cards were submitted to Branham's team who would choose the supplicants to be prayed for by Branham and organize the prayer line. Some critics accused Branham's team of sharing prayer card information with Branham before he began his prayer lines.

Financial difficulties
In 1955, Branham's campaigning career began to slow following financial setbacks. Even after he became famous, Branham continued to wear inexpensive suits and refused large salaries; he was not interested in amassing wealth as part of his ministry and was reluctant to solicit donations during his meetings. During the early years of his campaigns, donations had been able to cover costs, but from 1955, donations failed to cover the costs of three successive campaigns, one of which incurred a $15,000 deficit. ($ in 2020 dollars)

Some of Branham's business associates thought he was partially responsible because of his lack of interest in the financial affairs of the campaigns and tried to hold him personally responsible for the debt. Branham briefly stopped campaigning and said he would have to take a job to repay the debt, but the Full Gospel Business Men's Fellowship International ultimately offered financial assistance to cover the debt. Branham became increasingly reliant on the Full Gospel Businessmen to finance his campaign meetings as the Pentecostal denominations began to withdraw their financial support.

Finances became an issue again in 1956 when the Internal Revenue Service (IRS) charged Branham with tax evasion. The American government targeted the other leading revivalists with lawsuits during the same time period, including Oral Roberts, Jack Coe, and A. A. Allen. The IRS asserted income reported by the ministers as non-taxable gifts was taxable, despite the fact Branham had not kept the gifts for himself. Except Allen, who won his legal battle, the evangelists settled their cases out of court.

The IRS investigation showed Branham did not pay close attention to the amount of money flowing through his ministry, and had failed to document gifts and donations he received or how the proceeds were used. It also revealed that others assisting in his campaigns were taking financial advantage of the campaigns.  Branham reported his annual salary to the IRS as $7,000 ($ in 2020 dollars) while his manager Gordon Lindsay's was reported at $80,000. ($ in 2020 dollars) Comparatively, Oral Roberts earned a salary of $15,000 in the same years. Branham's case was eventually settled out of court when Branham admitted to tax evasion and agreed to pay of a $40,000 penalty. ($ in 2020 dollars) Branham was never able to completely pay off the tax liability.

End of the revival
By the mid-1950s, dozens of the ministers associated with Branham and his campaigns had launched similar healing campaigns. In 1956, the healing revival reached its peak, as 49 separate evangelists held major meetings. Branham and Lindsay ineffectively attempted to encourage the other evangelists to help their local churches rather than launch national careers. The Branham campaign held meetings across the United States in 1956, and a large meeting in Mexico City that had 20,000 in attendance. However the swelling number of competitors and emulators were further reducing attendance at Branham's meetings.

His correspondence also decreased sharply. Whereas he had once received "a thousand letters a day", by 1956 his mail dropped to 75 letters a day. Branham thought the decline was temporary. He continued expecting something greater, which he said "nobody will be able to imitate". In 1955, he reported a vision of a renewed tent ministry and a "third pull which would be dramatically different" than his earlier career; he began to increasingly refer to the vision as his popularity began to decline.

Amid the financial issues in 1956, Lindsay left Branham's campaign team. Branham eventually criticized the Voice of Healing magazine which he had helped create as a "massive financial organization" that put making money ahead of promoting good. The loss of Lindsay as a manager and the publicity of Voice of Healing was a major setback for Branham. After 1956, attendance at Branham's meetings dwindled and his appeal became limited to the loyal following that developed around him during the earlier years. Branham came to depend on The Herald of Faith published by Joseph Mattsson-Bose as his primary publicity tool for the final years of his ministry.

Branham also began to criticize other leading contemporaries in the healing revival leading to open hostilities between the evangelists. In 1957 Branham openly criticized A. A. Allen concerning the validity of a miracle reported in his campaigns. Allen replied by circulating a letter at the Christian Fellowship Convention criticizing Branham for creating divisions and suggesting Branham may soon die as a result of his actions.  Branham also began to criticize Oral Roberts and Billy Graham. The bad feelings and breakdown of cooperation between the leaders of the movement contributed to the end of the healing revival.

In the closing years of the revival, Branham helped launch and popularize the ministry of Jim Jones, the founder and leader of the Peoples Temple. According to Historian Catherine Wessinger, while rejecting Christianity as a false religion, Jones covertly used popular Christian figures to advance his own ideology. Jones needed a religious headliner to endorse his ministry and invited Branham to share the platform with him at a self-organized religious convention held at the Cadle Tabernacle auditorium in Indianapolis from June 11 to 15, 1956.

Branham critics Peter Duyzer and John Collins reported that Branham "performed numerous miracles", drawing a crowd of 11,000. Branham was an important influence on Jones, who copied many of his styles, methods, and teachings. Jones later became known for the mass murder and suicide at Jonestown in November 1978.

According to Collins, Jim Jones and Paul Schäfer were influenced to move to South America by Branham's 1961 prophecy concerning the destruction of the United States in a nuclear war. Jones later said that he and Branham "did not see eye to eye", and Jones accused Branham of being disingenuous.

Consensus among historians is that the healing revival ended in 1958. By 1960, the number of evangelists holding national campaigns dropped to 11. Several perspectives on the decline of the healing revival have been offered. Crowder suggested Branham's gradual separation from Gordon Lindsay played a major part in the decline. Harrell attributed the decline to the increasing number of evangelists crowding the field and straining the financial resources of the Pentecostal denominations.

Weaver agreed that Pentecostal churches gradually withdrew their support for the healing revival, mainly over the financial stresses put on local churches by the healing campaigns. The Assemblies of God were the first to openly withdraw support from the healing revival in 1953. Weaver pointed to other factors that may have helped destroy the initial ecumenism of the revival; tension between the independent evangelists and the Pentecostal churches caused by the evangelists' fund-raising methods, denominational pride, sensationalism, and doctrinal conflictsparticularly between the Oneness and Trinitarian factions within Pentecostalism. Weaver also believed that "fraud and chicanary" by the revivals evangelists also played a major role in the decline.

Later life

Teaching ministry

As the healing revival began to wane, many of Branham's contemporaries moved into the leadership of the emerging Charismatic movement, which emphasized use of spiritual gifts. The Charismatic movement is a global movement within both Protestant and non-Protestant Christianity that supports the adoption of traditionally Pentecostal beliefs, especially the spiritual gifts (charismata). The movement began in the teachings of the healing revival evangelists and grew as their teachings came to receive broad acceptance among millions of Christians.

At the same time the Charismatic movement was gaining broad acceptance, Branham began to transition to a teaching ministry. He began speaking on the controversial doctrinal issues he had avoided for most of the revival. By the 1960s, Branham's contemporaries and the Pentecostal denominations that had supported his campaigns regarded him as an extremely controversial teacher.

The leadership of the Pentecostal churches pressed Branham to resist his urge to teach and to instead focus on praying for the sick. Branham refused, arguing that the purpose of his healing ministry was to attract audiences and, having thus been attracted, it was time to teach them the doctrines he claimed to have received through supernatural revelation. Branham argued that his entire ministry was divinely inspired and could not be selectively rejected or accepted, saying, "It's either all of God, or none of God".

At first, Branham taught his doctrines only within his own church at Jeffersonville, but beginning in the 1960s he began to preach them at other churches he visited. His criticisms of Pentecostal organizations, and especially his views on holiness and the role of women, led to his rejection by the growing Charismatic movement and the Pentecostals from whom he had originally achieved popularity. Branham acknowledged their rejection and said their organizations "had choked out the glory and Spirit of God".  As a result of their view of his teachings, many Pentecostals judged that Branham had "stepped out of his anointing" and had become a "bad teacher of heretical doctrine".

Despite his rejection by the growing Charismatic movement, Branham's followers became increasingly dedicated to him during his later life. Some even claimed he was the Messiah, treated him as deity, and began to baptise and pray in his name. Branham quickly condemned their belief as heresy and threatened to stop ministering, but the belief persisted. Many followers moved great distances to live near his home in Jeffersonville and, led by Leo Mercer, subsequently set up a colony in Arizona following Branham's move to Tucson in 1962.

Many believed the rapture was imminent and that it was necessary to be near Branham in Arizona to take part. Branham lamented Mercer and the actions of his group as he worried that a cult was potentially being formed among his most fanatical followers. Before he died, some of his followers had already begun compiling his sermons and treating them as oral scripture, with a significant minority of his followers believing in his divinity.

Teachings

Branham developed a unique theology and placed emphasis on a few key doctrines, including his eschatological views, annihilationism, oneness of the Godhead, predestination, eternal security, and the serpent's seed. His followers refer to his teachings collectively as "The Message". Kydd and Weaver have both referred to Branham's teachings as "Branhamology"; other sources refer to his teachings as "Branhamism".

Most of Branham's teachings have precedents within sects of the Pentecostal movement or in other non-Pentecostal denominations. The doctrines Branham imported from non-Pentecostal theology and the unique combination of doctrines that he created as a result led to widespread criticism from Pentecostal churches and the Charismatic movement. His unique arrangement of doctrines, coupled with the highly controversial nature of the serpent seed doctrine, caused the alienation of many of his former supporters.

The Full Gospel tradition, which has its roots in Wesleyan Arminianism, is the theology generally adhered to by the Charismatic movement and Pentecostal denominations. Branham's doctrines are a blend of both Calvinism and Arminianism, which are considered contradictory by many theologians; the teachings have been described as "jumbled and contradictory and difficult to categorize". As a result, the theology he developed in the later years of his life seemed "complicated and bizarre" to many people who admired him personally during the years of the healing revival. Many of his followers regard his sermons as oral scripture and believe Branham had rediscovered the true doctrines of the early church.

Divine healing

Throughout his ministry, Branham taught a doctrine of faith healing that was often the central teaching he espoused during the healing campaign. He believed healing was the main focus of the ministry of Jesus Christ and believed in a dual atonement; "salvation for the soul and healing for the body". He believed and taught that miracles ascribed to Christ in the New Testament were also possible in modern times.

Branham believed that all sickness was a result of demonic activity and could be overcome by the faith of the person desiring healing. Branham argued that God was required to heal when faith was present. This led him to conclude that individuals who failed to be healed lacked adequate faith. Branham's teaching on divine healing were within the mainstream of Pentecostal theology and echoed the doctrines taught by Smith Wigglesworth, Bosworth, and other prominent Pentecostal ministers of the prior generation.

Restorationism

Of all of Branham's doctrines, his teachings on Christian restorationism have had the most lasting influence on modern Christianity. Charismatic writer Michael Moriarty described his teachings on the subject as "extremely significant" because they have "impacted every major restoration movement since". As a result, Moriarty concluded Branham has "profoundly influenced" the modern Charismatic movement. Branham taught the doctrine widely from the early days of the healing revival, in which he urged his audiences to unite and restore a form of church organization like the primitive church of early Christianity.

The teaching was accepted and widely taught by many of the evangelists of the healing revival, and they took it with them into the subsequent Charismatic and evangelical movements. Paul Cain, Bill Hamon, Kenneth Hagin, and other restoration prophets cite Branham as a major influence. They played a critical role in introducing Branham's restoration views to the Apostolic-Prophetic Movement, the Association of Vineyard Churches, and other large Charismatic organizations. The Toronto Blessing, the Brownsville Revival, and other nationwide revivals of the late 20th century have their roots in Branham's restorationist teachings.

The teaching holds that Christianity should return to a form mirroring the primitive Christian church. It supports the restoration of apostles and prophets, signs and wonders, spiritual gifts, spiritual warfare, and the elimination of non-primitive features of modern Christianity. Branham taught that by the end of the first century of Christianity, the church "had been contaminated by the entrance of an antichrist spirit". As a result, he believed that from a very early date, the church had stopped following the "pure Word of God" and had been seduced into a false form of Christianity.

He stated the corruption came from the desire of early Christianity's clergy to obtain political power, and as a result became increasingly wicked and introduced false creeds. This led to denominationalism, which he viewed as the greatest threat to true Christianity. Branham viewed Martin Luther as the initiator of a process that would result in the restoration of the true form of Christianity, and traced the advancement of the process through other historic church figures. He believed the rapture would occur at the culmination of this process. Although Branham referred in his sermons to the culmination of the process as a future event affecting other people, he believed he and his followers were fulfilling his restoration beliefs.

Annihilationism

Annihilationism, the doctrine that the damned will be totally destroyed after the final judgment so as to not exist, was introduced to Pentecostalism in the teachings of Charles Fox Parham (1873–1929). Not all Pentecostal sects accepted the idea. Prior to 1957, Branham taught a doctrine of eternal punishment in hell. By 1957 he began promoting an annihilationist position in keeping with Parham's teachings.

He believed that "eternal life was reserved only for God and his children". In 1960, Branham claimed the Holy Spirit had revealed this doctrine to him as one of the end-time mysteries. Promoting annihilationism led to the alienation of Pentecostal groups that had rejected Parham's teaching on the subject.

Godhead

Like other doctrines, the Godhead formula was a point of doctrinal conflict within Pentecostalism. As Branham began offering his own viewpoint, it led to the alienation of Pentecostal groups adhering to Trinitarianism. Branham shifted his theological position on the Godhead during his ministry. Early in his ministry, Branham espoused a position closer to an orthodox Trinitarian view.

By the early 1950s, he began to privately preach the Oneness doctrine outside of his healing campaigns. By the 1960s, he had changed to openly teaching the Oneness position, according to which there is one God who manifests himself in multiple ways; in contrast with the Trinitarian view that three distinct persons comprise the Godhead.

Branham came to believe that trinitarianism was tritheism and insisted members of his congregation be re-baptized in Jesus's name in imitation of Paul the Apostle. Branham believed his doctrine had a nuanced difference from the Oneness doctrine and to the end of his ministry he openly argued that he was not a proponent of Oneness doctrine. He distinguished his baptismal formula from the Oneness baptism formula in the name of Jesus by teaching that the baptismal formula should be in the name of Lord Jesus Christ. He argued that there were many people named Jesus but there is only one Lord Jesus Christ. By the end of his ministry, his message required an acceptance of the oneness of the Godhead and baptism in the name of Lord Jesus Christ.

Opposition to modern culture

As Branham's ministry progressed, he increasingly condemned modern culture. According to Weaver, Branham's views on modern culture were the primary reason the growing Charismatic movement rejected him; his views also prevented him from following his contemporaries who were transitioning from the healing revival to the new movement. He taught that immoral women and education were the central sins of modern culture. Branham viewed education as "Satan's snare for intellectual Christians who rejected the supernatural" and "Satan's tool for obscuring the 'simplicity of the Message and the messenger'". Weaver wrote that Branham held a "Christ against Culture" opinion, according to which loyalty to Christ requires rejection of non-Christian culture.

Pentecostalism inherited the Wesleyan doctrine of entire sanctification and outward holiness from its founders, who came from Wesleyan-influenced denominations of the post-American Civil War era. The rigid moral code associated with the holiness movement had been widely accepted by Pentecostals in the early twentieth century.  Branham's strict moral code echoed the traditions of early Pentecostalism but became increasingly unpopular because he refused to accommodate mid-century Pentecostalism's shifting viewpoint. He denounced cigarettes, alcohol, television, rock and roll, and many forms of worldly amusement.

Branham strongly identified with the lower-class roots of Pentecostalism and advocated living an ascetic lifestyle. When he was given a new Cadillac, he kept it parked in his garage for two years out of embarrassment. Branham openly chastised other evangelists, who seemed to be growing wealthy from their ministries and opposed the prosperity messages being taught. Branham did not view financial prosperity as an automatic result of salvation. He rejected the financial aspects of the prosperity gospel that originated in the teachings of Oral Roberts and A. A. Allen. Branham condemned any emphasis on expensive church buildings, elaborate choir robes, and large salaries for ministers, and insisted the church should focus on the imminent return of Christ.

Branham's opposition to modern culture emerged most strongly in his condemnation of the "immorality of modern women". He taught that women with short hair were breaking God's commandments and "ridiculed women's desire to artificially beautify themselves with makeup". Branham believed women were guilty of committing adultery if their appearance was intended to motivate men to lust, and viewed a woman's place as "in the kitchen". Citing the creation story in which Eve is taken from Adam's side, Branham taught that woman was not part of God's original creation, and she was a byproduct of man.

According to Weaver, "his pronouncements with respect to women were often contradictory". Branham once told women who refused to dress according to his instructions "not to call themselves Christians" but qualified his denunciations by affirming that obedience to the holiness moral code was not a requirement for salvation. While he did not condemn women who refused the holiness moral code to Hell, he insisted they would not be part of the rapture.

Weaver wrote that Branham's attitude to women concerning physical appearance, sexual drive, and marital relations was misogynistic, and that Branham saw modern women as "essentially immoral sexual machines who were to blame for adultery, divorce and death. They were the tools of the Devil." Some of Branham's contemporaries accused him of being a "woman hater", but he insisted he only hated immorality. According to Edward Babinski, women who follow the holiness moral code Branham supported regard it as "a badge of honor".

Serpent seed, Predestination, & Race

Branham taught an unorthodox doctrine on the source of original sin. He believed that the story of the fall of man in the Garden of Eden is allegorical and interpreted it to mean that the serpent had sexual intercourse with Eve, and their offspring was Cain. Branham also taught the belief that Cain's modern descendants were masquerading as educated people and scientists, and were "a big religious bunch of illegitimate bastard children" who comprised the majority of society's criminals. He believed that the serpent was an intelligent human-like ape he described as the missing link between the chimpanzee and man. Branham believed that the serpent was transformed into a reptile snake after it was cursed by God.

Branham believed the term "predestination" was widely misunderstood and preferred to use the word "foreknowledge" to describe his views. Branham's teachings on Predestination were deeply connected to his serpent seed doctrine. Branham taught that humanity's choice in salvation was negated by their ancestry, and that genetics determined one's eternal destiny; the offspring of Cain were foreordained to damnation while the offspring of Seth were foreordained to salvation.

Weaver commented that Branham seemed unaware that his teachings conflicted with free will, and that he taught a Calvinistic form of the doctrine of predestination and openly supported Calvin's doctrine of Eternal Security, both of which were at odds with the Arminian view of predestination held by Pentecostalism. Unlike his views on the Godhead and Annihilationism, there was no precedent within Pentecostalism for his views on predestination, and opened him to widespread criticism. Branham lamented that more so than any other teaching, Pentecostals criticized him for his predestination teachings.

According to Steven Hassan, "Branham's sermons lay the foundation to believe that black people are the inferior race." Branham used the term "hybrid" to describe anything he believed to be tainted by the serpent. Branham accused Eve of producing a "hybrid" race, and he provided a way to trace the hybrid line of the Serpent's Seed to Africans and Jews through Ham the biblical progenitor of the African peoples, King Ahab, and Judas Iscariot.

Branham reported discussing the possibility that blacks were descended from apes as early as 1929, but claimed to reject the belief at the time. In his recorded sermons, Branham first publicly hinted at his belief in the serpent seed doctrine in 1953. He began to openly teach serpent seed in 1958 at the height of racial unrest in the United States.

Doug Weaver, Jon Schambers, and Michael Barkun have investigated Branham's serpent seed doctrine to identify its origin. Weaver suggested that Branham may have become acquainted with the serpent seed doctrine through his Baptist roots. All three have suggested Branham may been influenced by the teachings of Baptist minister Daniel Parker's two-seed doctrine. Although not widely accepted, Parker's teachings were well known among Baptists in Indiana and Kentucky; Parker also connected the serpent's seed to the non-white races.

Barkun and Schambers also connected Branham's teaching to the white supremacy movement and Christian Identity preacher Wesley Swift. Branham was baptized and ordained by Roy Davis, a founding member and later Imperial Wizard of the Ku Klux Klan; Branham and Davis continued to associate throughout Branham's life. Barkun wrote that Branham was the most significant proponent of the racial teaching outside of Wesley Swift and the Christian Identity movement. Steven Hassan described Branham's Serpent Seed teachings as "rebranded" Christian Identity theology.

Branham was open about the implications of his beliefs and publicly supported segregation.

Branham also openly opposed interracial relationships and connected people of mixed race ancestry to the wicked "hybrid" race of the serpent.

According to the Southern Poverty Law Center, "Not all Branham churches are racist or embrace the anti-race-mixing position," "but the theology clearly invites racism." Weaver called Serpent Seed Branham's "most disreputable" doctrine. Branham's embrace of the serpent seed doctrine alienated most of the members of his Pentecostal audience. According to Pearry Green, The broader Pentecostal movement considers Branham's version of the serpent seed doctrine repugnant and in their point of view, it was the "filthy doctrine ... that ruined his ministry." No other mainstream Christian group held a similar view; Branham was widely criticized for spreading the doctrine.

Branham's followers consider the serpent seed doctrine one of his greatest revelations, and his most original; despite its racial nature, most are unaware of the origins of the teaching within the white supremacy movement. When confronted with the accusations of racism, some of his followers have denied the teaching of serpent seed has any connection to white supremacy or racism, and have pointed out that non-white followers of Branham accept the doctrine and its implications. Some African followers of Branham's teachings have embraced the racial components and openly call for the "submission of the black man to the white man". Hassan wrote that Branham's followers use "deceptive tactics to recruit and indoctrinate unsuspecting people," and that "recruiters do not tell new members" about the historic "deep ties to white supremacy groups." Leaders in Branham's movement have taken actions to prevent followers from discovering the true origin of the serpent seed teaching.

Eschatology and the Seven Seals

In his later years, Branham began to preach almost exclusively on biblical prophecy. In 1960, Branham preached a series of sermons on the seven church ages based on chapters two and three of the Book of Revelation. The sermons used the dispensational system of C. I. Scofield, Clarence Larkin, and Jehovah's Witness founder Charles Taze Russel. As in their dispensational systems, Branham said each church represents a historical age, and that the angel of each age was a significant church figure. Branham identified historical Christian figures as church age messengers, naming some of the same men as Russel.

Whereas Russel had claimed to be the seventh messenger himself during the 1890s, Branham's sermons differed and he described his own characteristics as the attributes of the Laodicean Church age messenger; Branham believed the age would immediately precede the rapture. Branham explained the Laodicean age would be immoral in a way comparable to Sodom and Gomorrah, and it would be a time in which Christian denominations rejected Christ.  As described by Branham, the characteristics of the Laodicean age resemble the modern era.

Branham also asserted the final messenger would be a mighty prophet who put the Word of God first, that he would be a lover of the wilderness, that he would hate wicked women, and be an uneducated person. Branham compared the messenger to this last age to John the Baptist and said he would come in the spirit of Elijah the prophet and cited the Book of Malachi 4:5–6 (3:23–24 in Hebrew) as the basis for claiming the Elijah spirit would return.

Branham preached a series of sermons in 1963 on the Seven Seals, which he regarded as a highlight of his ministry. Branham believed the sermons would produce "rapturing faith" which was necessary for his followers to escape the tribulation, and that the sermons contained "the complete revelation of Jesus Christ". Weaver wrote that "the importance of the revelation of the seals to Branham's 'prophetic' identity cannot be overestimated". Branham viewed the revelation of the seals as the crowning achievement of his ministry and the ultimate fulfillment of his purpose as a prophet.

According to Weaver, the sermons were primarily "a restatement of the dispensationalism espoused in the sermons on the seven church ages". The sermons focused on the Book of Revelation 6:1–17, and provided an interpretation of the meaning of each of the seals, which Branham connected with his prior sermons on the church ages. Like his sermons on the church ages, Branham's sermons on the seals were largely borrowed from the writings of Charles Taze Russell and Clarence Larkin.

Branham claimed the sermons were inspired through an angelic visitation and the appearance of what he believed to be a supernatural cloud in Arizona that was visible in the American Southwest on February 28, 1963. Branham interpreted the cloud to be the face of Jesus Christ, and a fulfillment of 1 Thessalonians 4:16: "For the Lord himself shall descend from heaven with a shout". Branham believed the events of 1963 indicated the rapture was imminent. As a result of his teachings, many of Branham's followers believe that Jesus Christ returned in some form in 1963.

By 1987, it was widely known the cloud Branham believed to be supernatural had been manmade and was reported as such by Weaver in his first biography of Branham. James McDonald of the University of Arizona Institute of Atmospheric Physics was present when the 1963 cloud phenomena appeared. He investigated the phenomena and discovered that the cloud had been created by an exploded Thor rocket carrying a classified spy satellite launched from Vandenberg Air Force Base that failed to make orbit.

The United States Air Force later declassified the launch records and acknowledged the manmade origin of the cloud. Military personnel involved in the launch stated that they had "immediately recognized the McDonald cloud as from an explosion of a rocket the afternoon of 28 February 1963". Branham claimed to his audiences that he was hunting in Arizona when angels appeared to him and created the cloud overhead. Peter Duyzer presented evidence that Branham falsely claimed to be hunting in Arizona when the cloud appeared, and was actually in Texas where he was assisting with efforts to have the death sentence of Leslie Elaine Perez overturned.

In his sermons on the seven seals, Branham again indicated he was a prophet who had the anointing of Elijah and was a messenger heralding the second coming of Christ. Branham did not directly claim to be the end-time messenger in either of his sermons on the church ages or the seven seals. Weaver believed Branham desired to be the eschatological prophet he was preaching about, but had self-doubt. At the time, Branham continued to leave the identity of the messenger open to the interpretation of his followers, who widely accepted that he was that messenger.

Beginning in 1958, Branham began to claim Luke 17:30 was being fulfilled. By the 1960s, he began to make frequent references to the scripture claiming that through his ministry the "Son of Man was being revealed". According to Weaver, Branham's "obsession with Luke 17:30 and Malachi 4:5–6 dominated the end of his ministry". In 1964 and 1965 he began to make special emphasis that the Son of Man could only be revealed through the ministry of a prophet. Branham's teachings on the subject caused confusion among his followers who repeatedly asked him to clarify his relationship to Christ. Some of his followers believed he was claiming divinity and were prepared to accept his claims.

Branham's responses and statements on the subject of his divinity were contradictory leaving his followers divided on the subject. In his final revival meetings before his death, Branham stated "The Elijah of this day is the Lord Jesus Christ. He is to come according to Luke 17:30. The Son of Man is to reveal Himself among His people. Not a man, God. But it'll come through a prophet." His final statement on the subject convinced a number of his followers he was indeed claiming divinity.

Anti-denominationalism

Branham believed denominationalism was "a mark of the beast", which added to the controversy surrounding his later ministry. Branham stated that he was not opposed to organizational structures; his concern focused on the "road block to salvation and spiritual unity" he believed denominations created by emphasizing loyalty to their organizations. Branham's doctrine was similar to the anti-Catholic rhetoric of classical Pentecostalism and Protestantism, which commonly associated the mark of the beast with Catholicism.

Branham, however, adopted the teaching of Charles Taze Russell which associated the image of the beast with Protestant denominations. In his later years, he came to believe all denominations were "synagogues of Satan". Branham's teaching was particularly damaging to his relationship with Pentecostals denominations who were angered that he would associate them with the mark of beast.

Scholar Robert Price and Doug Weaver suggested that Branham's stance on denominations was developed in response to their rejection of his teachings in an attempt to maintain the loyalty of his closest followers. Throughout the 1960s, Branham demanded his listeners leave any denomination they were part of to demonstrate their loyalty to him and his message. He argued that continued allegiance to any denomination would lead to an acceptance of the mark of the beast, which would mean missing the rapture.  He insisted the prior healing revival when he cooperated with denominations had been a preparatory step to get the attention of God's chosen people, so he could eventually inform them of their need to exclusively follow his teaching ministry.

Prophecies

Branham issued a series of prophecies during his lifetime. One of his first was a prophetic vision he reported having in 1916 foretelling that 16 men would fall to their death during the construction of the Clark Memorial Bridge. Branham claimed repeatedly throughout his ministry that the vision was fulfilled during the 1927–1929 construction of the bridge, but there is no evidence of the drownings having ever occurred. Branham also claimed that he foretold the coming of the 1937 Ohio River Flood, the same flood he told his audience led to the death of his wife and daughter.

His most significant prophecies were a series of prophetic visions he claimed to have in June 1933. The first time he published any information about the visions were in 1953. Branham reported that in his visions he saw seven major events would occur before the Second Coming of Christ, including the prediction of the rise of Adolf Hitler, the Second World War, the Italian occupation of Ethiopia, and the rise of communism. Most of his predictions had already been fulfilled by the first time he reported the visions in 1953.

In the 1933 visions, he reported seeing self-driving "egg-shaped" cars in one vision. Branham later claimed he saw a car in 1960 that fulfilled his vision. Among the prophecies was also a prediction that the United States would "elect the wrong president" as a result of giving women the right to vote, which he later interpreted to be John F. Kennedy. He also predicted a powerful woman would take control of the United States, which he later interpreted to be the Roman Catholic Church, which he reported as also being fulfilled with the election of Kennedy who was Roman Catholic. His visions ended with the apocalyptic destruction of the United States that left the nation's cities in smoldering ruins. After sharing his prophetic visions, Branham offered a prediction that the rapture would happen by 1977.

In 1964, Branham said judgement would strike the west coast of the United States and that Los Angeles would sink into the ocean; his most dramatic prediction. Following the 1964 prophecy, Branham again predicted the rapture would happen by 1977 and would be preceded by various worldwide disasters, the unification of denominational Christianity, and the rise-to-power of the Roman Catholic Pope. Branham was deeply anti-Catholic, and viewed the Pope and the Roman Catholic Church as the agents of Satan who would bring about the end of the world. Branham's prediction of the end of the world by 1977 was widely circulated and well known. After the world failed to end in 1977, Time Magazine included the failed prediction as one of the "top ten end-of-the-world prophecies".

Weaver wrote that Branham gradually revised and embellished some of his prophecies over time, sometimes substantially. Critics of Branham investigated his prophecies. They claimed that many of Branham prophecies were only publicly reported after their fulfillment. Duzyer also reported that several of Branham's prophecies, like the 16 drownings or the destruction of the United States, were never fulfilled. Branham's followers believe his prophecies came true, or will do so in the future.

Death

Branham continued to travel to churches and preach his doctrine across Canada, the United States, and Mexico during the 1960s. His only overseas trip during the 1960s proved a disappointment. Branham reported a vision of himself preaching before large crowds and hoped for its fulfillment on the trip, but the South African government prevented him from holding revivals when he traveled to the country in 1965. Branham was saddened that his teaching ministry was rejected by all but his closest followers.

Pentecostal churches which once welcomed Branham refused to permit him to preach during the 1960s, and those who were still sympathetic to him were threatened with excommunication by their superiors if they did so. He held his final set of revival meetings in Shreveport at the church of his early campaign manager Jack Moore in November 1965. Although he had hinted at it many times, Branham publicly stated for the first time that he was the return of Elijah the prophet in his final meetings in Shreveport.

On December 18, 1965, Branham and his familyexcept his daughter Rebekahwere returning to Jeffersonville, Indiana, from Tucson for the Christmas holiday. He was rushed to the hospital in Amarillo where he remained comatose for several days and died of his injuries on Christmas Eve, December 24, 1965.

Branham's death stunned the Pentecostal world and shocked his followers. His funeral was held on December 29, 1965, but his burial was delayed until April 11, 1966; Easter Monday. Most eulogies only tacitly acknowledged Branham's controversial teachings, focusing instead on his many positive contributions and recalled his wide popularity and impact during the years of the healing revival. Gordon Lindsay's eulogy stated that Branham's death was the will of God and privately he accepted the interpretation of Kenneth E. Hagin, who claimed to have prophesied Branham's death two years before it happened. According to Hagin, God revealed that Branham was teaching false doctrine and God was removing him because of his disobedience.

In the confusion immediately following Branham's death, expectations that he would rise from the dead developed among his followers. Most believed he would have to return to fulfill a vision he had regarding future tent meetings. Weaver attributed the belief in Branham's imminent resurrection to Pearry Green, though Green denied it. Even Branham's son Billy Paul seemed to expect his father's resurrection and indicated as much in messages sent to Branham's followers, in which he communicated his expectation for Easter 1966. The expectation of his resurrection remained strong into the 1970s, in part based on Branham's prediction that the rapture could occur by 1977. After 1977, some of his followers abandoned his teachings.

Legacy and influence
Branham was the "initiator of the post-World War II healing revival" and, along with Oral Roberts, was one of its most revered leaders. Branham is most remembered for his use of the "sign-gifts" that awed the Pentecostal world. According to writer and researcher Patsy Sims, "the power of a Branham service and his stage presence remains a legend unparalleled in the history of the Charismatic movement." The many revivalists who attempted to emulate Branham during the 1950s spawned a generation of prominent Charismatic ministries.

Branham has been called the "principal architect of restorationist thought" of the Charismatic movement that emerged from the healing revival. The Charismatic view that the Christian church should return to a form like that of the early church has its roots in Branham's teachings during the healing revival period. The belief is widely held in the modern Charismatic movement, and the legacy of his restorationist teaching and ministering style is evident throughout televangelism and the Charismatic movement.

The more controversial doctrines Branham espoused in the closing years of his ministry were rejected by the Charismatic movement, which viewed them as "revelatory madness". Charismatics are apologetic towards Branham's early ministry and embrace his use of the "sign-gifts". Charismatic author John Crowder wrote that his ministry should not be judged by "the small sliver of his later life", but by the fact that he indirectly "lit a fire" that began the modern Charismatic movement. Non-Charismatic Christianity completely rejected Branham.

Crowder said Branham was a victim of "the adoration of man" because his followers began to idolize him in the later part of his ministry. Harrell took a similar view, attributing Branham's teachings in his later career to his close friends, who manipulated him and took advantage of his lack of theological training. Weaver also attributed Branham's eschatological teachings to the influence of a small group of his closest followers, who encouraged his desire for a unique ministry.  According to Weaver, to Branham's dismay, his followers had placed him at the "center of a Pentecostal personality cult" in the final years of his ministry.

Edward Babinski describes Branham's followers as "odd in their beliefs, but for the most part honest hard-working citizens", and wrote that calling them a cult "seems unfair". While rejecting Branham's teachings, Duyzer offered a glowing review of Branham's followers, stating he "had never experienced friendship, or love like we did there". Though Branham is no longer widely known outside Pentecostalism, his legacy continues today. Summarizing the contrasting views held of Branham, Kydd stated, "Some thought he was God. Some thought he was a dupe of the devil. Some thought he was an end-time messenger sent from God, and some still do."

Branham's followers

Followers of Branham's teachings can be found around the world; Branham claimed to have made over one million converts during his campaign meetings. In 1986, there were an estimated 300,000 followers. In 2000, the William Branham Evangelical Association had missions on every inhabited continentwith 1,600 associated churches in Latin America and growing missions across Africa. In 2018, Voice of God Recordings claimed to serve Branham-related support material to about two million people through the William Branham Evangelical Association, and estimated there were 2–4 million total followers of Branham's teachings.

Branham's followers do not have a central unifying leadership. Shortly after Branham's death, his followers divided in multiple feuding groups. Many different followers of Branham's teachings have claimed to be his immediate successor, or an Elisha to his Elijah. Many also believe that Branham's son Joseph has claimed the inheritance of his father's ministry. Each of the men claiming to be his successor have established new sects of Branham's followers.

Branham's sons Joseph and Billy Paul lead the William Branham Evangelical Association and hold influence over many churches.  Peary Greene (1933–2015) in Arizona, and Ewald Frank in Germany both held influence over a significant number of churches. Tensions over Branham's identity are one the primary causes of divisions between the groups. Followers of Branham's son expect the resurrection of Branham to fulfill unfinished prophecies. Followers of the Green and Frank believe Branham's prophecies will have a spiritual fulfillment and not require his return. Still other groups believe Branham was the return of Christ.

His followers "range widely in belief in practice." Some followers have attempted to reform Branham's most extreme teachings. While most churches adhere to a common set of tenets, the "extreme local authority" of the church promoted by Branham has led to widespread differences in interpretation of Branham's prophetic teachings.  One common theme among all groups is the belief that Branham was the return of Elijah the prophet and receiving his prophetic revelations is necessary to escape the impending destruction of the world.

Some groups of Branham's followers refuse medical treatment because of their divine healing beliefs.  Many followers of Branham's teachings live within insular communities, with their own schools and with no access to television or internet or outside media. Some groups prohibit their members from having relationships with outsiders. Those who leave are often shunned or disowned.

People who try to leave the teachings of Branham often face extreme repercussions. Carl Dyck wrote, "Those who have come out of this group give solemn evidence of the devastating effect that Branhamism had on them, both emotionally and psychologically. In fact, the followers of Branham pray that evil will come upon people who leave their church." Branham's followers have harassed critics and individuals who reject Branham's teachings. Dyck reported that people who published material critical of Branham's teachings have been threatened by his followers and warned they may be killed. The news media have also reported critics of Branham's teaching being threatened and harassed by his followers.

In his book Churches that Abuse, Ronald Enroth wrote that some churches use Branham's teachings to "belittle, insult, and berate" their members as part of their discipleship teachings on submission, humility, and obedience. According to Enroth, Branham's followers believe subjecting themselves to this treatment is necessary for them to "be refined and perfect"  and "ready to meet Jesus" at this second coming. Enroth reported instances of families being separated, with children being taken from their parents and reassigned to other families to be raised as a form of discipline. He also reported multiple cases of physical abuse against both adults and children in the United States and Mexico.

Branham's followers are widely spread throughout the world. In Iran, Branham's followers have faced persecution, with the government shutting down ten of their house churches in 2018 and jailing several Branham followers. In 2020, the Russian government labeled missionaries of Branham's teaching as "extremists" and banned the importation of Branham related publications to the Russian Federation.

Branham's followers are often in the news for criminal activity. In a 2008 California court case, authorities investigating Leo Mercer's group of Branham followers in Arizona discovered that following "Branham's death in 1965, Mercer gradually became more authoritative, employing various forms of punishment. He would ostracize people from the community and separate families. Children were beaten for minor infractions like talking during a march or not tying their shoes. Mercer would punish girls by cutting their hair, and force boys to wear girls' clothing. There was also evidence that Mercer sexually abused children."

"In one instance, Mercer ordered that [a girl's] hair be cut off to punish her because he had had a vision from God that she was being sexually inappropriate with young children. [She] was beaten and forced to wear masculine clothes that covered much of her body, hiding her bruises. Her fingertips were burned so she would know what hell felt like." Mercer sexually abused children and adults. Survivors reported that they subjected themselves to Mercer's abuses because of direction they received personally from Branham.

The Living Word Fellowship, a group of over 100 churches at its peak, was founded by John Robert Stevens, who had been heavily influenced by Branham and promoted many of his doctrines, was often reported in the news during the 1970s and 1980s as a doomsday cult. The organization disbanded in 2018 following widespread allegations of sexual molestation of children.

In 2002, Ralph G. Stair, a leader of a Branham's followers in United States, was arrested and convicted of molesting minors, raping multiple women in his church, and financial crimes.

Paul Schäfer, a follower and promoter of William Branham's teachings based in Chile, was discovered to have been running a compound where he was sexually molesting and torturing children in 1997. "Strong ties were forged" between Schäfer, William Branham, and Ewald Frank during Branham's time in Germany. Schäfer  and other members of his church served as William Branham's personal security detail on his 1955 European tour. William Branham's second sermon during his visit to Karlsruhe, Germany, left a deep impression on Schäfer. Schäfer claimed to experience a healing in the meeting, and thereafter began to put more of William Branham's doctrines into practice in his group, and began to insist to his followers that they were the only "only faithful ones" to William Branham's teachings. Schäfer had a history of child molestation dating to the 1950s. Schäfer was later arrested in 2006, convicted, and died in prison.

The government of Chile banned Ewald Frank from entering the country after finding he had been visiting and holding revival meetings with Schäfer's followers at Colonia. Court records indicate Frank was a key figure in helping Colonia establish its weapons factories by contracting with German arms producers to assist the colony in setting up their operations. Alleged accomplices in Schäfer's crimes who were charged and awaiting trial fled Chile and took refuge in Frank's church in Germany, where they were protected from extradition. German protestors picketed in front of Frank's church to protest his actions. Schäfer and his compound were portrayed in the 2015 film Colonia.

In 2014, Robert Martin Gumbura, a leader of Branham's followers in Zimbabwe, was arrested and convicted for raping multiple women in his congregation. Gumbura and his followers were polygamous. Gumbara reportedly had relations with over 100 women. He died in prison in 2021.

Polygamist followers of Branham's teachings have also been reported by news media in the United States for marriage to minors. Authorities have gone so far as to raid one church and threaten members with legal action for violating bigamy laws. Polygamy is a point of conflict among Branham's followers; not all groups accept the practice. Supporters of polygamy claim Branham authorized the practice in his 1965 sermon entitled "Marriage and Divorce".

Roberts Liardon commented, "According to Branham, since women introduced men to sex, polygamy was brought about. Women had to be punished. So men could have many wives, but women only one husband."

In 2020, Joaquim Gonçalves Silva, a prominent leader of Branham's followers in Brazil was accused of raping multiple women. Sivas died while awaiting trial for his alleged crimes.

In 1997, the O'odham Nation in Arizona accused Wayne Evans of defrauding their tribe of over $1 million and giving that money to Voice of God Recordings. The tribe filed a racketeering case against them to recover their money. In 2001, Evans pleaded guilty to charges of embezzlement, and Voice of God Recordings returned the funds to the tribe.

Joseph Coleman, a follower of William Branham in the United States with influence over multiple churches, was connected to "a multi-million dollar fraud through an investment management company". News reported that Coleman's son had solicited over $20 million in funds under false claims. He and his fellow conspirators pleaded guilty in 2010 and in 2011 were sentenced to two years in prison and ordered to pay millions in restitution. The FBI reported that, "rather than using the investors' capital to support the two funds, the defendants used the vast majority of investor money to purchase lavish gifts for their friends and themselves"

In 2020, Vinworth Dayal, a minister who promoted Branham's teachings in Trinidad was arrested and charged with money laundering through his church.

Pearry Green was a defendant in multiple criminal cases concerning his financial dealings. In a 2003 case, he pleaded guilty to theft of government property in U.S. District court.

In 2014, Pastor Donny Reagan made news in the United States for promoting Branham's racial teachings. Several news outlets labeled Reagan as the "most racist pastor in America." Kacou Philippe, a leader of Bramham's followers in Africa, was arrested in 2017 for hate speech and sentenced to one year prison after preaching in multiple African nations that blacks should be submissive towards whites. Philippe insisted decolonization of Africa was a sin, and that Africans could only prosper when in servitude to Europeans.

In 2017, street preachers promoting Branham in Canada began to make national news in the United States and Canada for their aggressive behavior. Their tactics prompted officials to pass legislation targeting their activities in 2019. They were arrested multiple times in both countries for harassing women for their appearance and disrupting church services. The CBC investigated Branham and focused their reporting on his connections to Jim Jones and the Ku Klux Klan and labeled Branham's followers a "doomsday cult". In 2021, they were reported in the news again as fugitives who were evading arrest after attacking women at a Presbyterian Church in Canada.

In 2018, Pastor Théodore Mugalu, a leader of Branham's followers in the Democratic Republic of Congo encouraged his followers to violence against Catholics in his country. News reports claimed that Mugala's followers forced 145 priests and nuns to strip naked, cover their heads, and filmed their whippings.

In 2021, Steven Hassan's Freedom of Mind Institute published an article labeling Branham's followers a cult stating, "Branham's ministry was characterized by white supremacy and deeply misogynist attitudes." "The Message cult has always been deeply connected to white supremacy groups."

According to Hassan, Branham's followers use "deceptive tactics to recruit and indoctrinate unsuspecting people. Recruiters do not tell new members that the cult originated with deep ties to white supremacy groups." Hassan concluded by stating that "The Message churches have a significant following and an enormous potential to influence people and create violence."

Notes

Footnotes

References

Further reading

Hagiographical

External links
 
 
 Evangelical Times: 'William Branham', by Eryl Davies

1909 births
1965 deaths
20th-century apocalypticists
American faith healers
American Christian mystics
American Pentecostal pastors
American Charismatics
American segregationists
Angelic visionaries
Annihilationists
Branhamism
People adherents to christian new religious movements
Christians from Indiana
Christians from Kentucky
Converts to Christianity
Cult leaders
Nondenominational Christianity
Oneness Pentecostals
Pentecostal theologians
People from Jeffersonville, Indiana
People from Cumberland County, Kentucky
Prophets
Protestant mystics
Pyramidologists
Segregationist theology
Road incident deaths in Texas